Jezebelle, also known as Jezebelle of the Fiery Eyes, is a fictional character, a superheroine in publications from DC Comics. Created by Gerry Conway and Don Newton, the character first appeared in New Gods #12 (July 1977). She was the second female character in the series, after Big Barda.

Fictional character biography
A mutant born on Apokolips, she was once one of Granny Goodness' students, but not a Female Fury. The beautiful blue-skinned, yellow-eyed and crimson-haired Jezebelle was always depicted as being reluctant to kill, so when she was captured during a battle with New Genesis, she gladly defected.

New Gods vol. 3 #1 featured her death caused by one of Necromina's "morrow blocks", but she was later seen alongside other supposedly dead New Gods Forager and Highfather in the Seven Soldiers: Mister Miracle limited series of 2006.

Powers and abilities
Aside from possessing superior physical attributes and fighting skills, Jezebelle can fire heat rays from her eyes, fly, and survive unprotected in the cold airless void of space.

Brief bibliography
 New Gods vol. 1: #12 - 19
 Adventure Comics: #459-460
 New Gods vol. 2: #1

References

External links
 Cosmic Teams: Jezebelle
 Fourth World index
 Inhabitants of the Fourth World

Comics characters introduced in 1977
DC Comics aliens
DC Comics deities
DC Comics demons
DC Comics female superheroes
New Gods of Apokolips
Characters created by Gerry Conway